The Communauté de communes Pévèle-Carembault is a communauté de communes in the Nord département and in the Hauts-de-France région of France. It was formed on 1 January 2014 by the merger of several former communautés de communes. Its seat is in Pont-à-Marcq. Its area is 310.3 km2, and its population was 95,816 in 2018.

Communes
The Communauté de communes consists of the following 38 communes:
 
Aix-en-Pévèle
Attiches
Auchy-lez-Orchies
Avelin
Bachy
Bersée
Beuvry-la-Forêt
Bourghelles
Bouvignies
Camphin-en-Carembault
Camphin-en-Pévèle
Cappelle-en-Pévèle
Chemy
Cobrieux
Coutiches
Cysoing
Ennevelin
Genech
Gondecourt
Herrin
Landas
Louvil
Mérignies
Moncheaux
Mons-en-Pévèle
Mouchin
La Neuville
Nomain
Orchies
Ostricourt
Phalempin
Pont-à-Marcq
Saméon
Templeuve-en-Pévèle
Thumeries
Tourmignies
Wahagnies
Wannehain

References 

Commune communities in France
Intercommunalities of Nord (French department)